Cesare Facciani (21 February 1905 – 29 August 1938) was an Italian cyclist. He won the gold medal in Men's team pursuit in the 1928 Summer Olympics along with Giacomo Gaioni, Mario Lusiani and Luigi Tasselli.
He was forced to suspend operations in 1934 due to an illness which led to his death four years later.

References

1905 births
1938 deaths
Cyclists at the 1928 Summer Olympics
Olympic cyclists of Italy
Olympic gold medalists for Italy
Italian male cyclists
Olympic medalists in cycling
Cyclists from Turin
Medalists at the 1928 Summer Olympics
Italian track cyclists
20th-century Italian people